Anežka Paloudová (born 19 January 1999) is a Czech female canoeist  who won 19 medals at senior level at the Wildwater Canoeing World Championships and European Wildwater Championships.

Medals at the World Championships
Senior

References

External links
 

1999 births
Living people
Czech female canoeists
European Games competitors for the Czech Republic
Canoeists at the 2019 European Games
People from Český Krumlov
Sportspeople from the South Bohemian Region